Samsam or SamSam may refer to:

Media 
SamSam, French-Belgian children's television program
SamSam (film), a 2019 film based on the program

People 
Samsam al-Dawla, the Buyid amir of Iraq between 983 to 987
Sinan ibn Ulayyan, 11th-century Bedouin leader, also known as Samsam al-Dawla
Samsam ol-Saltaneh, Iranian Prime Minister and leader of the Iranian Constitutional Revolution
Samsam Gullas, Filipino politician serving as the mayor of Talisay

Places 
Samsam Kandi, also known simply as Samsam, a village in Iran
Samsami, a city in Iran

Other uses 
SamSam, a strain of malware
Kelantan-Pattani Malay, also known as Samsam Malay, an Austronesian language of the Malayic subfamily spoken in the southernmost provinces of Thailand

See also 
"A Ram Sam Sam", popular Moroccan children's song
Sam (disambiguation)